Muse is a surname. Notable people with the surname include:

Alexander Muse (born 1972), American businessman
Arizona Muse (born 1988), American fashion model
C. Anthony Muse (born 1958), American politician
David Muse, (1949–2022), American rock musician, longtime member of the band Firefall
George and Willie Muse (1893–1971 and 1892–2001), African-American circus performers and the subject of the 2016 book Truevine
John Muse (born 1988), American ice hockey player
John Muse (businessman), American businessman
Munirudeen Adekunle Muse (born 1939), Nigerian politician
Nick Muse (born 1998), American football player
Sunday Muse, Canadian actress and voice actress
Tanner Muse (born 1996), American football player
William Muse (born 1939), American university president

See also
 Muse (disambiguation)